The FIL European Luge Championships 1984 took place in Olang, Italy for the third time after hosting the event previously in 1975 and 1980.

Men's singles

Haspinger earned his third straight bronze medal in this event at the championships.

Women's singles

Men's doubles

Medal table

References
Men's doubles European champions
Men's singles European champions
Women's singles European champions

FIL European Luge Championships
1984 in luge
Luge in Italy
1984 in Italian sport